Abdullah bin Khalid Al Saud (Arabic: عبد الله بن خالد بن سلطان آل سعود) (born 13 February 1988) is a member of the House of Saud and Saudi Arabia's permanent representative to the United Nations in Vienna, ambassador to Austria, and nonresident ambassador to Slovakia and Slovenia.

Biography
Abdullah bin Khalid bin Sultan was born in 1988 to Khalid bin Sultan Al Saud, former Saudi deputy minister of defense and commander of the joint Arab forces during the Gulf War. He graduated from Columbia University in 2010 with a bachelor's degree in economics and obtained his master's degree in business management from MIT Sloan School of Management in 2015.

He was appointed Saudi Arabia's ambassador to Austria in April 2019 and presented his credentials on 28 August 2019. He was also appointed as the country's permanent delegate to the United Nations and international organizations in Vienna and presented his credentials on 2 September 2019. On 21 January 2020, he also became Saudi Arabia's non-residential ambassador to Slovenia and Slovakia.

As Saudi Arabia's representative to the International Atomic Energy Agency, he has called for a comprehensive international agreement and intensified inspections into Iran's nuclear program.

He has served as an adviser to the Royal Court since 2017, a member of the executive committee of the National Air Services holding company, and a director of the Equestrian Club of Riyadh.

References

External links

21st-century diplomats
21st-century Saudi Arabian politicians
1988 births
Ambassadors of Saudi Arabia to Austria
Ambassadors of Saudi Arabia to Slovakia
Ambassadors of Saudi Arabia to Slovenia
Columbia University alumni
Abdullah
Living people
MIT Sloan School of Management alumni